Sandi Čebular (born 24 June 1986) is a Slovenian professional basketball player who last played for CB Breogán of the Liga Española de Baloncesto.

Professional career
He played for KK Šentjur (Slo), Union Olimpija (Slo), CB Rosalía de Castro (Spa), Geoplin Slovan (Slo), KK Helios (Slo) and Peñas Huesca (Spa) before he signed with KK Rogaška.

On 28 February 2018 Cebular signed with Spanish second division team CB Breogán until end of season 2017–18.

Slovenian national team
Čebular competed for the senior Slovenian national basketball team at the 2007 FIBA European Championship.

References

External links 
ABA League Profile

1986 births
Living people
ABA League players
CB Breogán players
CB Peñas Huesca players
KK Krka players
KK Olimpija players
KK Šentjur players
Mahram Tehran BC players
Shooting guards
Slovenian expatriate basketball people in Iran
Slovenian expatriate basketball people in Spain
Slovenian men's basketball players
Sportspeople from Celje
Helios Suns players